The 1952 Winter Olympics cross-country skiing competition consisted of three events for men (18 km, 50 km and 4 × 10 km relay) and the first women's cross-country competition at an Olympic Games, of 10 km. The competitions were held from Monday, 18 February to Saturday, 23 February 1952.

Medal summary

Medal table

Men's events

Women's events

Participating nations
A total of 138 cross-country skiers from 19 nations competed at the Oslo Games:

References

External links
International Olympic Committee results database

 
1952 Winter Olympics
1952 Winter Olympics events
Olympics
Cross-country skiing competitions in Norway